Mor Gregorios Kuriakose is a Syriac Orthodox bishop, currently Suffragan bishop of the Knanaya Archdiocese in charge of Kallisserry Region.

Education
Kuriakose received a Bachelor of Divinity (B.D) from Kimmage Mission Institute, Ireland. and studied economics at 
Christian College, Indore. He received a Master of Theology (M.Th) from  Paurasthya Vidyapeedom, Vadavathoor.

See also
Jacobite Syrian Christian Church
 Oriental Orthodox Church
 Saint Thomas Christians

References

Living people
Syriac Orthodox Church bishops
Indian Oriental Orthodox Christians
1954 births